Pine Bluff 20A is an Indian reserve of the Cumberland House Cree Nation in Saskatchewan. It is 60 miles southwest of Flin Flon, and on the north shore of the Saskatchewan River.

References

Indian reserves in Saskatchewan
Division No. 18, Saskatchewan